Cédric Fofana (born September 15, 2003) is a Canadian diver in the springboard (3 metre) events.

Career
In 2018, Fofana won bronze in the 14-15 age category in the springboard (3 m) diving event at the 2018 FINA World Junior Diving Championships in Kyiv, Ukraine. 

In July 2021, Fofana won the individual 3 m springboard competition at the Canadian Olympic Diving trials. This qualified him to compete in the individual event at the 2020 Summer Olympics, However, at the Tokyo Olympics he did not proceed beyond the preliminary round, finishing last in a field of 29 divers.

He competed at the 2022 Commonwealth Games where he came 7th in the Men's 1 metre springboard event.

References

External links
 

2003 births
Living people
Canadian male divers
Divers from Montreal
Divers at the 2020 Summer Olympics
Olympic divers of Canada
Divers at the 2022 Commonwealth Games
Commonwealth Games competitors for Canada